Forensic: The Truth Lies Within, or also called Forensic, is a 2022 Indian Hindi-language psychological thriller film directed by Vishal Furia. It is a remake of the 2020 Malayalam film Forensic. The film stars Vikrant Massey, Radhika Apte, Prachi Desai, Rohit Roy and Harbanddana Kaur. The story, set in Mussoorie, follows a police officer and forensic specialist who are on the trail together of a serial killer. It was released on ZEE5 on 24 June 2022.

Plot 
In Mussoorie, young girls are going missing on their birthdays and then turning up as dismembered bodies. Megha, a police officer, has no choice but work with forensic expert Johnny who is also her ex-boyfriend, to investigate the crime. Megha and Johnny's siblings were married to each other in the past. After a gruesome tragedy, Megha has forbidden Johnny’s brother Abhay from meeting his own daughter Aanya. When the bodies keep piling up even after an alleged killer is apprehended, Megha and Johnny are both suspended at work. They must find their own way to uncover the mystery and are guided by Johnny’s forensic skills and a few opportune events.

Cast
Vikrant Massey  as Forensic specialist Johnny Khanna
Radhika Apte as SI Megha Sharma
Rohit Roy as Abhay Khanna, Johnny's elder brother 
Prachi Desai as Therapist Ranjana Gupta / Shashi
Vindu Dara Singh as constable Rawat
Anant Mahadevan as Dr. Rajeev Gupta
 Narendra Gupta as Dr. Solanki

References

External links
 
 Forensic  at ZEE5

Indian psychological thriller films
2022 psychological thriller films
2020s Hindi-language films
Indian direct-to-video films
Hindi remakes of Malayalam films